Hector-Jonathan Crémieux (10 November 1828 – 30 September 1893) was a French librettist and playwright. His best-known work is his collaboration with Ludovic Halévy for Jacques Offenbach's Orphée aux Enfers, known in English as Orpheus in the Underworld.

Life
Crémieux was born in Paris to a Jewish family - he was related to the lawyer Adolphe Crémieux .  He studied law and then worked in the civil service.  His first play, Fiesque (1852) was a historical drama, but before long he started to write comedies and then, in collaboration, operetta and opéra comique librettos. His collaborations with Halévy were often written under the joint pseudonym Paul d'Arcy.

In 1887, Crémieux became secretary-general of the Société des Dépôts Comptes Courants, and ceased writing.  Five years later, the Société collapsed and he committed suicide by gunshot in Paris.

Libretti

For Jacques Offenbach

 Le savetier et le financier (1856) - with E About
 Une demoiselle en loterie (1857) - with Louis-Adolphe Jaime
 Orphée aux enfers (Orpheus in the Underworld) (1858) - with Ludovic Halévy
 Geneviève de Brabant (1859) - by Louis-Adolphe Jaime and Etienne Tréfeu (revised by Crémieux with Tréfeu)
 La chanson de Fortunio (1861) - with Ludovic Halévy
 Le pont des soupirs (1861) - with Ludovic Halévy
 M. Choufleuri restera chez lui le . . . (1861) - with M de Saint Rémy, Ernest L'Épine and Ludovic Halévy
 Le roman comique (1861) - with Ludovic Halévy
 Jacqueline (1862) - with Ludovic Halévy, with common pseudonym Pol d’Arcy
 Les bergers (1865) - with Philippe Gille
 Robinson Crusoé (1867) - with Eugène Cormon
 La jolie parfumeuse (1873) - with Ernest Blum
 Bagatelle (1874) - with Ernest Blum 
 La foire Saint-Laurent (1877) - with A de Saint-Albin

For Léo Delibes
Les eaux d’Ems (1861) - with Ludovic Halévy

For Hervé
Le petit Faust (1869) - with Louis-Adolphe Jaime
Les Turcs (1869) - with Louis-Adolphe Jaime
Le trône d'Écosse (1871) - with Louis-Adolphe Jaime
La veuve du Malabar (1873) - with A. Delacour
La belle poule (1875) - with A de Saint-Albin

For Léon Vasseur
La famille Trouillat (1874) - with Ernest Blum

Plays
Amongst the plays written by Hector-Jonathan Crémieux are:
Fiesque: drame en cinq actes et huit tableaux, en vers, d'après Schiller (1852) - with his brother, Émile Crémieux, and based on Friedrich Schiller's play Die Verschwörung des Fiesco zu Genua
Germaine: drame en cinq actes et huit tableaux  (1858) - with Adolphe d'Ennery and based on Edmond About's novel of the same name 
La voie sacrée, ou, Les étapes de la gloire: drame militaire en cinq actes (1859) - with Eugène Woestyn and Ernest Bourget
Le pied de mouton (1859) - with Charles-Théodore Cogniard and Jean-Hippolyte Cogniard
L'Abbe Constantin (1882) - with Pierre Decourcelle and based on Ludovic Halévy's novel of the same name
Autour du mariage (1883) - with the Comtesse de Martel and based on her novel of the same name

References
 
New Grove Dictionary of Opera, vol 1, p. 1004 .

External links 

 Jewish Encyclopedia: Crémieux, Hector-Jonathan, written by Isidore Singer and J. Fuchs

French opera librettists
19th-century French dramatists and playwrights
1828 births
1892 deaths
19th-century French Jews
Writers from Paris
Suicides in France
19th-century male writers
1890s suicides